Rastislav Bizub (born 12 September 1972) is a Czech swimmer. He competed at the 1992 Summer Olympics and the 1996 Summer Olympics.

References

1972 births
Living people
Czech male swimmers
Olympic swimmers of Czechoslovakia
Olympic swimmers of the Czech Republic
Swimmers at the 1992 Summer Olympics
Swimmers at the 1996 Summer Olympics
Sportspeople from Martin, Slovakia